The Middle Fork of the Little Red River Bridge, also known as the Shirley Railroad Bridge, is a historic bridge in Shirley, Arkansas. The main span rests on large concrete piers set in the river. The bridge was built in 1908 for the Missouri and North Arkansas Railroad, and carried the railroad until 1949. In 1978 the tracks were covered by a concrete deck, and the bridge was converted to single-lane vehicular road use, carrying County Road 125.

The bridge was listed on the National Register of Historic Places in 2010.

See also
List of bridges documented by the Historic American Engineering Record in Arkansas
List of bridges on the National Register of Historic Places in Arkansas
National Register of Historic Places listings in Van Buren County, Arkansas

References

External links

Historic American Engineering Record in Arkansas
Road bridges on the National Register of Historic Places in Arkansas
Bridges completed in 1908
Railroad bridges on the National Register of Historic Places in Arkansas
1908 establishments in Arkansas
Truss bridges in the United States
Iron bridges in the United States
National Register of Historic Places in Van Buren County, Arkansas
Transportation in Van Buren County, Arkansas
Little Red River (Arkansas)